Snitz may refer to:

 Snitz Edwards (1868–1937), American stage and silent film actor born Edward Neumann
 Edmund L. Gruber (1879–1941), US Army general and military music composer, author of "The Caissons Go Rolling Along"
 Snitz Snider, Samford Bulldogs men's basketball head coach (1942–1943) and sprinter - see 1928 NCAA Track and Field Championships  
 Gerald Snyder (1905–1983), American National Football League player
 Kobi Snitz, mathematician and a leading member of the Boycott from Within association
 Snitz Creek, Quentin, Pennsylvania, United States

 

Lists of people by nickname